Aman Island is an islet in South Seberang Perai District, Penang, Malaysia, located off the coast of Seberang Perai.

Known as the "Island of Peace", it is a home to a traditional Malay village. Places of interest in Aman Island include Jalan Telaga Emas, Batu Perompak, and the nearby Gedung Island.

Aman Island and Gedung Island were once owned by Mr. Mohamad Saad and his older brother. Mr. Mohamad Saad died at the age of 99.

See also
 List of islands of Malaysia

References 

Islands of Penang
South Seberang Perai District